Chemnitz dialect is a distinct German dialect of the city of Chemnitz and an urban variety of Vorerzgebirgisch, a variant of Upper Saxon German.

Phonology

Consonants

 are bilabial, whereas  are labiodental.
 are dental .
  is alveolar  after .
The  contrast is restricted to the word-initial position. In many cases, it corresponds to the  contrast in Standard German.
 occurs only in onsets, and it has a few possible pronunciations, which are in free variation with one another:
Voiced uvular approximant ;
Voiced  or voiceless  lenis uvular fricative;
Voiceless uvular trill ;
Voiceless lenis uvular stop .
 may be voiced between sonorants.
When a stop or fricative precedes, the sequences  can be realized as syllabic consonants . The nasals appear depending on the place of articulation of the preceding consonant, so that it can be bilabial , dental , velar  or uvular .
When another nasal precedes a syllabic nasal, such sequence is realized as a single consonant of variable length.
Non-phonemic glottal stop  is inserted in two cases:
Before word-initial vowels, even the unstressed ones.
Before stressed syllable-initial vowels within words.

Vowels

 The pharyngealized vowels correspond to the sequences of vowel +  in the standard language.
 The non-native vowels are occasionally used in cognates of some Standard German words, such as brüder  ('brothers').
  are often diphthongal  in careful speech. Monophthongal realizations are optionally shortened in certain positions.
  corresponds to Standard German .
 Monophthongs are somewhat retracted when they precede dorsals, except . The retraction is strongest before . To a certain extent, this is also true of monophthongs that follow dorsal consonants.
 Monophthongs are allophonically pharyngealized if a vowel in the following syllable is pharyngealized.
 The phonetic quality of the monophthongs is as follows:
  are close to the canonical values of the corresponding IPA symbols .
  is close-mid .
  are more central than the canonical values of the corresponding IPA symbols: .
  is mid .
  is mid near-back .
  are central .
  is near-open near-front .

 The ending points of Chemnitz German diphthongs are close to the canonical values of the corresponding IPA symbols.

Sample
The sample text is a reading of the first sentence of The North Wind and the Sun.

Broad phonetic transcription

Orthographic version (standard German)

References

Bibliography

 

Central German languages
Chemnitz
German dialects
Languages of Germany
City colloquials